Yaakov Havakook ( also Ya'acov) is an anthropologist and orientalist from Ben-Gurion University of the Negev in Be'er-Sheva.

Biography

Havakook researched the cave dwellers of Southern Mount Hebron, between 1977 and 1982. During his research he lived with the locals in the caves, khirbas and villages, wore their clothes, ate their food, spoke their language and carried an Arabic nickname. The resulting book, Life in the Caves of Mount Hebron, was published by the Israeli Ministry of Defense in 1985, and is used by both the Israeli army and the Palestinian inhabitants of the caves to bolster their arguments in the ongoing dispute over who has a right to them. His study of the living circumstances among the Negev Bedouin were published in 1985/1986.

Awards
Havakook won the Itzhak Sade award for military literature in 1999.

Books
Life in the caves of Mount Hebron (1985) (חיים במערות הר חברון)
Mibeit Hasecar Leveit Ha'Even ("From the Goat Hair to Stone; Transition in Bedouin Dwellings"; Tel Aviv: Ministry of Defense, 1986) 
Islamic Terrorism: Profile of the Hamas Movement, with Shakib Saleh (Tel Aviv, 1999)

References

Year of birth missing (living people)
Living people
Ben-Gurion University of the Negev alumni
Israeli anthropologists
Israeli Jews
Israeli orientalists
Israeli writers
Tel Aviv University alumni
University of Haifa alumni
Jewish anthropologists